9949 Brontosaurus, provisional designation , is a stony asteroid from the inner regions of the asteroid belt, roughly 10 kilometers in diameter. It was discovered on 22 September 1990, by Belgian astronomer Eric Elst at ESO's La Silla Observatory in northern Chile. It was named after Brontosaurus, a genus of dinosaurs.

Orbit and classification 

Brontosaurus orbits the Sun in the inner main-belt at a distance of 2.2–2.5 AU once every 3 years and 7 months (1,319 days). Its orbit has an eccentricity of 0.06 and an inclination of 8° with respect to the ecliptic.

Physical characteristics

Diameter and albedo 

According to the surveys carried out by the Infrared Astronomical Satellite IRAS and NASA's Wide-field Infrared Survey Explorer with its subsequent NEOWISE mission, Brontosaurus measures 17 and 4.231 kilometers in diameter, respectively. WISE/NEOWISE also gives an albedo of 0.248 for the body's surface. It has an absolute magnitude of 13.8.

Rotation period 

As of 2017, the asteroid's rotation period and shape remain unknown.

Naming 

This minor planet was named after Brontosaurus, a gigantic quadruped sauropod dinosaurs, which walked on all four legs and lived in the Upper Jurassic. Adult individuals measured up to 20 meters and had a weight of up to 20 tons. Many Fossils have been found in the United States. Brontosaurus is one of the best-known dinosaurs. The official naming citation was published by the Minor Planet Center on 20 November 2002.

References

External links 
 Asteroid Lightcurve Database (LCDB), query form (info )
 Dictionary of Minor Planet Names, Google books
 Asteroids and comets rotation curves, CdR – Observatoire de Genève, Raoul Behrend
 Discovery Circumstances: Numbered Minor Planets (5001)-(10000) – Minor Planet Center
 
 

009949
Discoveries by Eric Walter Elst
Named minor planets
19900922
Apatosaurinae